Phyllonorycter cytisella is a moth of the family Gracillariidae. It is endemic to the Canary Islands and is known from Gran Canaria, La Palma, and Tenerife.

Ecology
The larvae feed on Chamaecytisus palmensis and Chamaecytisus proliferus. They mine the leaves of their host plant. They create a lower-surface tentiform mine, with deep folds. The mine strongly contracts the leaflet. Pupation takes place inside the mine.

References

cytisella
Moths of Africa
Endemic insects of the Canary Islands
Taxa named by Hans Rebel
Moths described in 1896